"Ten Green Bottles" is a popular children's repetitive song that consists of a single verse of music that is repeated, with each verse decrementing by one the number of bottles on the wall. The first verse is:

This pattern continues until the number of bottles reaches zero. The final verse ends with "There'll be no green bottles hanging on the wall."

Various other versions of the lyrics exist, many of them vulgar or satirical.

See also
 Repetitive song
 "99 Bottles of Beer"
 "Ten German Bombers"
 "Ten Little Injuns"

References

English children's songs
English folk songs
Traditional children's songs
British culture
Fictional objects
Year of song unknown
Songwriter unknown
Cumulative songs